Presidential elections were held in Burkina Faso on 15 November 1998. They were boycotted by the major opposition parties and resulted in a victory for incumbent President Blaise Compaoré. Voter turnout was 56.1%.

Results

References

Presidential elections in Burkina Faso
Burkina Faso
1998 in Burkina Faso